Pavlo Lukyanets (born February 8, 1988) is a Ukrainian footballer who played as a forward.

Playing career

Ukraine 
Lukyanets began playing in 2005 with FC Volyn Lutsk in the Ukrainian Premier League. The following season he signed with FC Obolon' Kyiv in the Ukrainian First League. During his tenure in Kiev he also played in the Ukrainian Second League with Obolon's reserve squad. After five seasons in Kiev he returned to the Ukrainian Second League to play with FC Nafkom Brovary. After a season with Nafkom he signed with FC Nyva-V Vinnytsia, where he won the 2009–10 Ukrainian League Cup.

Within the same season the club achieved promotion to the First League, but were relegated in the 2011-12 season. After the relegation of Vinnytsia he remained in the First League with FC Helios Kharkiv. In 2013, he returned to the Ukrainian Second League with his former club Obolon Kiev, and had stints with FC Enerhiya Nova Kakhovka, and FC Sudnobudivnyk Mykolaiv.

Canada 
He went abroad in 2017 to play in the Canadian Soccer League with FC Ukraine United, where he assisted the Toronto club in achieving a perfect season, and winning the Second Division Championship. While in his second year he assisted in securing the First Division title. In 2019, he featured in the CSL Championship final against Scarborough SC, but in a losing effort.

Honors

FC Nyva-V Vinnytsia 
 Ukrainian League Cup: 2009-2010

FC Ukraine United 
 CSL II Championship: 2017
 Canadian Soccer League First Division: 2018

References 

1988 births
Living people
Footballers from Kyiv
Ukrainian footballers
FC Volyn Lutsk players
FC Obolon-Brovar Kyiv players
FC Obolon-2 Kyiv players
FC Nafkom Brovary players
FC Nyva Vinnytsia players
FC Kramatorsk players
FC Helios Kharkiv players
FC Enerhiya Nova Kakhovka players
FC Sudnobudivnyk Mykolaiv (2016) players
FC Ukraine United players
Ukrainian Premier League players
Canadian Soccer League (1998–present) players
Association football forwards
Ukrainian First League players
Ukrainian Second League players